Cochylimorpha diana is a species of moth of the family Tortricidae. It is found in Asia Minor, Syria, the Palestinian Territories, Armenia, Lebanon and Iran.

The wingspan is 16–25 mm.

References

 
 

D
Moths of Asia
Moths described in 1899